Chainoi Worawut (born 24 June 1997) is a Thai professional boxer who has held the WBC-ABC super bantamweight title since 2019.

Early life
Worawut was born into a family of fighters, his father Chatchainoi Chaoraioi was a famous Muay Thai kickboxer in the 1980s and 1990s. His uncle Takrawlek Dejrath was also a former Muay Thai kickboxer and was a contemporary 108 pound boxing contender.

Before turning professional, he has had about 250 Muay Thai fights.

Professional boxing career
Worawut made his professional debut against Hui Lu on 19 May 2018. He won the fight by a second-round knockout. Worawut amassed an 8–0 record during the next 17 months, winning all both one of those fights by way of stoppage. Worawut won the vacant WBC Youth super bantamweight title during this run, with a second-round technical knockout of the undefeated Muhammad Ashiq on 20 April 2019.

Worawut was scheduled to face Alvin Medura for the vacant WBC-ABC super bantamweight title on 19 October 2019, at the Workpoint Studio in Bang Phun. He won the fight by a sixth-round technical knockout, flooring Medura at the 1:35 minute mark. Worawut made his first title defense against  Daichi Matsuura on 21 December 2019. He won the first twelve-round bout of his career by unanimous decision. Worawut next faced Artid Bamrungauea in a non-title bout on 7 March 2020. He won the fight by a third-round technical knockout. Worawut fought in yet another non-title bout on 1 August 2020, against Jomar Fajardo. He won the fight by a quick second-round knockout.

Worawut was booked to make his second WBC-ABC super bantamweight title defense against the journeyman Joel Kwong on 5 September 2020, at the Workpoint Studio in Bang Phun. He won the fight by a fourth-round technical knockout. Worawut staggered Kwong down with a flurry of punches near the end of the round, which forced the Filipino boxer the take a knee. Kwong was unsteady on his feet after beating the ten count, which prompted his cornermen to throw in the towel. Three months later, on 5 December 2020, Worawut faced Anurak Madua in a non-title bout. He won the fight by a fast second-round technical knockout.

Worawut made his third WBC-ABC super bantamweight title defense against the former two-time WBO bantamweight champion Panya Uthok on 13 March 2021, at the Workpoint Studio in Bang Phun. He won the DAZN broadcast bout by unanimous decision, with scores of 97–93, 98–92 and 98–92. Worawut was booked to make his fourth WBC-ABC title defense against the 40-fight veteran Sukpraserd Ponpitak on 15 January 2022. As the bout failed to materialize, Worawut instead faced Kompayak Porpramook in a non-title bout on 26 February 2022. He won the fight by unanimous decision. 

One month later, on 26 March, Worawut faced Jelbirt Gomera. He made quick work of his opponent, stopping Gomera with a left hook at the 2:12 minute mark of the second round. Worawut made his fourth WBC-ABC title defense against Ken Jordan on 28 May 2022. He won the fight by unanimous decision, with all three judges awarding him every single round of the bout. Worawut made his fifth WBC-ABC title defense against Kevin Aseniero on 27 August 2022. He won the fight by unanimous decision, with scores of 98–92, 96–94 and 97–93.

Worawut faced the journeyman Jopher Marayan in a stay-busy fight on 26 November 2022. He won the fight by a third-round technical knockout. Worawut made his seventh WBC-ABC title defense against Jhon Gemino on 25 February 2023. He won the fight by unanimous decision.

Professional boxing record

References

Living people
1997 births
Chainoi Worawut
Chainoi Worawut
Super-bantamweight boxers